Katharina Filter (born 4 February 1999) is a German female handball player for København Håndbold and the German national team.

She represented Germany at the 2021 World Women's Handball Championship in Spain.

References

External links

1999 births
Living people
Sportspeople from Hamburg
German female handball players
21st-century German women